Agios Petros (Greek for Saint Peter) may refer to the following places in Greece: 

Agios Petros, Arcadia, a village in the municipality of North Kynouria, Arcadia
Agios Petros, Kilkis, a village in the municipal unit of Evropos, Kilkis regional unit
Agios Petros, Lefkada, a village in the municipal unit of Apollonioi, Lefkada